Chundale  is a village in Wayanad district in the state of Kerala, India.
Chundale is located near Kalpetta, the district headquarters of Wayanad.

Tourist attractions
 Vaduvanchal, kalpetta. 
 Puliyarmala Jain Temple, Kalpetta. 
 Wayanad Heritage Museum, Kalpetta. 
 Glass Temple, Kalpetta.

Demographics
 India census, Achooranam had a population of 9754 with 4755 males and 4999 females.

Transportation
Chundale is 69 km by road from Kozhikode railway station and this road includes nine hairpin bends. The nearest major airport is at Calicut. The road to the east connects to Mysore and Bangalore. Night journey is allowed on this sector as it goes through Bandipur national forest. The nearest railway station is Mysore.  There are airports at Bangalore and Calicut.

Image gallery

See also
 Kalpetta town
 Mango Orange village
 Vaduvanchal town
 Meppadi town

References

External links
 Maple Oak Holiday Home- Private Homestay in Chundale, Wayanad. 

Villages in Wayanad district
Kalpetta area